Missouri Valley Community School District is a rural public school district headquartered in Missouri Valley, Iowa.  The distract spans areas in Harrison County and Pottawattamie County.  Total per pupil expenditures in the Missouri Valley Community School District totals $7,115, while the state average is $7,962.{when?}

Schools in the MVCSD

Missouri Valley Elementary School
The Missouri Valley Elementary School, formally known as Linn School, was built in 1956 and expanded in 1998. This building houses grades prekindergarten - 5th grades.

Missouri Valley Middle School
The Missouri Valley Middle School part was constructed so that students from the high school don't intermix but some facilities are shared. The middle school now contains 240 students in grades 6-8.

Missouri Valley High School
Built in 1976, The Missouri Valley High School has 270 students at its 605 E. Lincoln Highway location. An Iowa Communications Network fiber optics room and 4 computer labs are housed here. The school was expanded to add the middle school section in 1998 to replace the old middle school on 8th street which was torn down. A new weight room and wrestling room were added to the front of the high school in the fall of 1999.

Other Important Buildings
District Office (Formerly Primary)
The new superintendent office is now located in the old Primary Building. 
Bus Barn
Old Middle School Gym

Athletics Milestones 
The MV Big Reds Cross Country team has won the Western Iowa Conference meet at IKM-Manning in 2021.

The MV Lady Reds won the 1987 XC State Championship.

See also
List of school districts in Iowa

References

External links
Missouri Valley Community School District

School districts in Iowa
Education in Harrison County, Iowa
School districts established in 1956
1956 establishments in Iowa